This article lists people who have been named ACM Fellow, an award and fellowship granted by the Association for Computing Machinery (ACM) as its highest honorary grade of membership, reserved for ACM members who have exhibited "professional excellence" in their "technical, professional and leadership contributions" Since 1993, the people that have been elected as fellows are listed below:

Fellows

1994

James M. Adams
Frances E. Allen
Franz Leopold Alt
William F. Atchison
Richard H. Austing
Kenneth E. Batcher
C. Gordon Bell
Michael W. Blasgen
Danny Bobrow
David Reeves Boggs
Lorraine Borman
Charles L. Bradshaw
Daniel S. Bricklin
Frederick P. Brooks Jr.
Douglas K. Brotz
Richard R. Burton
Richard G. Canning
Walter M. Carlson
Vinton G. Cerf
Donald D. Chamberlin
Edgar F. Codd
Edward G. Coffman
Fernando J. Corbató
Harvey G. Cragon
Thomas A. D'Auria
Thomas A. DeFanti
Peter J. Denning
Jack B. Dennis
L Peter Deutsch
Edsger W. Dijkstra

J. Presper Eckert
Peter Elias
Gerald L. Engel
John H. Esbin
Bob O. Evans
Tse-Yun Feng
Aaron Finerman
Robert W. Floyd
Michael J. Flynn
Robert Frankston
Frank L. Friedman
Bernard A. Galler
C. W. Gear
Adele J. Goldberg
Calvin C. Gotlieb
Susan L. Graham
Jim Gray
Cordell Green
David Gries
Carl Hammer
Richard Hamming
David Harel
Fred H. Harris
Juris Hartmanis
Danny Hillis
John Hopcroft
Tom Hull
J. N. Hume
Harry Douglas Huskey
William Kahan
Ronald M. Kaplan
Richard M. Karp
Donald Knuth
David J. Kuck
Thomas Eugene Kurtz
Ray Kurzweil
Butler W. Lampson
Stephen S. Lavenberg
Joshua Lederberg
John A. Lee
Meir M. Lehman
Bruce G. Lindsay
Joyce Currie Little
Chung Laung Liu
M. Stuart Lynn
Herbert Maisel
Zohar Manna
John McCarthy
Edward J. McCluskey
Daniel D. McCracken
Paul R. McJones
A J Milner
Jack Minker
Roger Michael Needham
Peter G. Neumann
Monroe M. Newborn
John Kenneth Ousterhout
Susan S. Owicki
David Lorge Parnas
David A. Patterson
William B. Poucher
Anthony Ralston
Ronald L. Rivest
Azriel Rosenfeld
Jeff Rulifson
Jean E. Sammet
Dana Scott
Daniel Siewiorek
Herbert A. Simon
Barbara B. Simons
Martha E. Sloan
Donald R. Slutz
Burton J. Smith
Richard E. Stearns
Thomas B. Steel
Guy L. Steele
Harold S. Stone
Michael Stonebraker
William Strecker
Bjarne Stroustrup
Patrick Suppes
Gerald Sussman
Ivan Sutherland
Edward A. Taft
Robert E. Tarjan
Robert William Taylor
Charles P. Thacker
Irving L. Traiger
Joseph Traub
Allen B. Tucker
Andries van Dam
Willis Howard Ware
Stuart Wecker
Ben Wegbreit
Eric A. Weiss
David John Wheeler
Maurice Vincent Wilkes
Shmuel Winograd
Niklaus Wirth
Seymour J. Wolfson
William Allan Wulf
L. A. Zadeh

1995

Paul W. Abrahams
Robert L. Ashenhurst
Alan H. Barr
Lawrence Bernstein
Grady Booch
David H. Brandin
Richard P. Brent
Loren C. Carpenter
Edwin Catmull
Robert Lee Constable
Dorothy E. Denning
David J. DeWitt
Larry E. Druffel
Erwin Engeler
Stuart I. Feldman
Henry Fuchs
Zvi Galil
M. R. Garey
Myron Ginsberg
John B. Goodenough
Donald P. Greenberg
Herbert R. J. Grosch
Bertram Herzog
Harold J. Highland
Lance J. Hoffman
Oscar H. Ibarra
David S. Johnson
Cliff B. Jones
Kenneth W. Kennedy
Won Kim
S. Rao Kosaraju
Richard E. Ladner
S. Lakshmivarahan
Ed Lazowska
Nancy G. Leveson
Jay Misra
Jürg Nievergelt
Anthony G. Oettinger
Franco P. Preparata
Roy Rada
Daniel J. Rosenkrantz
Gerard Salton
Fred B. Schneider
Larry Snyder
Norihisa Suzuki
Jeffrey D. Ullman
Chris S. Wallace
Peter Wegner
John R. White
J. Turner Whitted
Gio Wiederhold
Chak-Kuen Wong
Andrew C. Yao
Paul R. Young

1996

William Richards Adrion
Alfred V. Aho
Narendra Ahuja
Kurt Akeley
Ruzena Bajcsy
Gregor von Bochmann
Anita Borg
B. Chandrasekaran
Bernard Chazelle
Narsingh Deo
George G. Dodd
José Luis Encarnação
Jeanne Ferrante
Michael J. Fischer
Dennis J. Frailey
Robert M. Graham
Michael A. Harrison
Philip Heidelberger
Mary Jane Irwin
Jeffrey M. Jaffe
Raj Jain
Anita K. Jones
Randy H. Katz
Maria M. Klawe
Lawrence H. Landweber
Michael E. Lesk
Henry M. Levy
Barbara H. Liskov
Richard R. Muntz
Richard E. Nance
Takao Nishizeki
Bryan T. Preas
T. R. N. Rao
Edward M. Reingold
John R. Rice
Arnold L. Rosenberg
Sartaj K. Sahni
Hanan Samet
John E. Savage
Ravi Sethi
Mary M. Shaw
Abraham Silberschatz
John A. Stankovic
Larry Stockmeyer
Andrew S. Tanenbaum
Mary K. Vernon
Uzi Vishkin
Jeffrey S. Vitter
Anthony I. Wasserman
Mark Wegman
Fred W. Weingarten
Ian Witten

1997

Ian F. Akyildiz
Jean-Loup Baer
Victor R. Basili
Roger R. Bate
Barry W. Boehm
Imrich Chlamtac
J. D. Couger
W. Bruce Croft
Gordon B. Davis
David P. Dobkin
Herbert Freeman
Hector Garcia-Molina
Irene Greif
Yuri Gurevich
John L. Hennessy
Zvi Kedem
Richard A. Kemmerer
H. W. Lawson
Der-Tsai Lee
Richard J. Lipton
Nancy A. Lynch
Daniel A. Menasce
Raymond E. Miller
Ronald H. Perrott
Nicholas Pippenger
Vaughan R. Pratt
John H. Reif
Raymond Reiter
Paul Schneck
Robert Sedgewick
Kenneth Clem Sevcik
Micha Sharir
Alan C. Shaw
Ben Shneiderman
Kenneth Steiglitz
Donald F. Towsley
Elaine J. Weyuker
Peter Widmayer
Robert Wilensky
Philip S. Yu

1998

Dharma P. Agrawal
Gregory R. Andrews
Andrew W. Appel
Hal Berghel
James C. Browne
Robert S. Cartwright
Peter P. Chen
Edmund M. Clarke
Lori A. Clarke
Richard J. Cole
Clarence A. Ellis
Richard P. Gabriel
Gopal Krishna Gupta
James Jay Horning
Neil D. Jones
Aravind K. Joshi
Abraham Kandel
Stephen T. Kent
Simon S. Lam
Kai Li
David Maier
David Notkin
Susan Nycum
Leon J. Osterweil
P. Venkat Rangan
John T. Richards
Lawrence A. Rowe
Barbara G. Ryder
Alan L. Selman
Carlo H. Séquin
Howard Jay Siegel
Eugene H. Spafford
Éva Tardos
Richard N. Taylor
Albert J. Turner
Emmerich Welzl
Jeannette M. Wing
Mihalis Yannakakis
Stuart H. Zweben

1999

Marc Auslander
Kenneth P. Birman
Ronald J. Brachman
Robert T. Braden
Robert L. Cook
Joseph S. DeBlasi
James Demmel
Richard J. Fateman
James D. Foley
John D. Gannon
C. M. Geschke
Carlo Ghezzi
Robert L. Glass
Ronald L. Graham
Leonidas J. Guibas
Toshihide Ibaraki
Takeo Kanade
Philip M. Lewis
David B. MacQueen
Dianne Martin
Larry Masinter
Kurt Mehlhorn
David L. Mills
Dhiraj K. Pradhan
Ahmed Sameh
Pamela Samuelson
Marc Snir
Richard T. Snodgrass
Mary Lou Soffa
Chung-Jen Tan
Koji Torii
David L. Waltz
John Warnock
Akinori Yonezawa

2000

Prithviraj Banerjee
Francine Berman
Laxmi N. Bhuyan
Alan W. Biermann
Shahid H. Bokhari
Randy Bryant
Peter Buneman
Stuart K. Card
Michael J. Carey
Douglas E. Comer
Karen Duncan
Deborah Estrin
Ronald Fagin
Peter A. Freeman
W. Kent Fuchs
Donald J. Haderle
Michael T. Heath
Leonard Kleinrock
Henry F. Korth
Axel van Lamsweerde
Raymond A. Lorie
Donald W. Loveland
Albert R. Meyer
James H. Morris
Larry L. Peterson
Moshe Y. Vardi
David S. Warren
Reinhard Wilhelm
Robin J. R. Williams
Willy Zwaenepoel

2001

Jacob A. Abraham
Robert M. Aiken
Tetsuo Asano
Philip A. Bernstein
Joel S. Birnbaum
Alan H. Borning
Yuri Breitbart
Jin-Yi Cai
David D. Clark
Susan B. Davidson
Johan de Kleer
Jack Dongarra
David J. Farber
Joan Feigenbaum
Domenico Ferrari
Sally Floyd
Erol Gelenbe
John P. Hayes
S. Sitharama Iyengar
Ravishankar K. Iyer
Joseph F. JaJa
Robert E. Kahn
Sung-Mo Kang
Richard B. Kieburtz
Robert A. Kowalski
Jeffrey Kramer
James F. Kurose
Ruby B. Lee
Witold Litwin
Giovanni De Micheli
Barton P. Miller
Jeffrey C. Mogul
Donald A. Norman
Cherri M. Pancake
Christos Papadimitriou
Donn B. Parker
Janak H. Patel
Yale N. Patt
Ira Pohl
J. Mark Pullen
Prabhakar Raghavan
Raghu Ramakrishnan
Ramamritham Krithivasan
John C. Reynolds
George G. Robertson
Nick Roussopoulos
Krishan K. Sabnani
Ravi Sandhu
Hans-Jörg Schek
Richard D. Schlichting
Kang G. Shin
David B. Shmoys
Alan J. Smith
Ralf Steinmetz
Jonathan Turner
Marilyn C. Wolf
Ouri Wolfson
Pamela Zave

2002

Pankaj K. Agarwal
Vishwani D. Agrawal
Özalp Babaoğlu
Jon Crowcroft
David E. Culler
William J. Dally
Thomas G. Dietterich
Susan J. Eggers
Harold N. Gabow
Ambuj Goyal
Adolfo Guzmán-Arenas
Joseph Halpern
Wen-mei Hwu
Neil Immerman
Sidney Karin
Wendy A. Kellogg
David B. Lomet
Gary L. Miller
C. Mohan
Jeffrey F. Naughton
Bantwal R. Rau
David Salesin
Mahadev Satyanarayanan
Mateo Valero
George Varghese
John Wilkes

2003

Rakesh Agrawal
Mostafa Ammar
Victor Bahl
Bonnie Berger
Elisa Bertino
John M. Carroll
Richard A. DeMillo
Barbara J. Grosz
Brent Hailpern
Jiawei Han
Mary Jean Harrold
Peter E. Hart
Mark A. Horowitz
Paul Hudak
H. V. Jagadish
Anil K. Jain
Ramesh C. Jain
Niraj K. Jha
Dexter Kozen
Lin Yi-bing
Kathleen McKeown
Thomas P. Moran
Eugene W. Myers
Craig Partridge
Daniel A. Reed
Stuart J. Russell
William H. Sanders
Scott J. Shenker

C. J. van Rijsbergen

2004

Bella Bose
Janis A. Bubenko Jr.
Luca Cardelli
Andrew A. Chien
George E. Collins
Joel Emer
Allan Gottlieb
Vicki L. Hanson
Mark D. Hill
Yannis E. Ioannidis
Frans Kaashoek
Per-Åke Larson
Peter Lee
Paul V. Mockapetris
Simon Peyton Jones

Michael D. Schroeder
Stamatis Vassiliadis
Benjamin W. Wah
David S. Wise

2005

Thomas E. Anderson
Dines Bjørner
Stephen R. Bourne
Rodney Brooks
Surajit Chaudhuri
Keith D. Cooper
David L. Dill
Christophe Diot
Michel Dubois
Michael J. Franklin
Ophir Frieder
Robert Harper
Maurice Herlihy
Phokion G. Kolaitis
Vipin Kumar
T. V. Lakshman
Brad A. Myers
David M. Nicol
Krishna Palem
Thomas W. Reps
Lui Sha
Mikkel Thorup
Eli Upfal
Umesh Vazirani
Vijay Vazirani
Roy Want
Gerhard Weikum

Daniel S. Weld
Michael P. Wellman
Jennifer Widom
Walter Willinger
David A. Wood
Hui Zhang

2006

Eric Allender
Arvind
Mikhail J. Atallah
Ming-Syan Chen
Susan T. Dumais
Usama Fayyad
Matthias Felleisen
Kenneth D. Forbus
Phillip B. Gibbons
C. Lee Giles
Albert G. Greenberg
William D. Gropp
Roch Guerin
John V. Guttag
Laura M. Haas
Alon Yitzchak Halevy
Anthony C. Hearn
Thomas A. Henzinger
Norman P. Jouppi
John E. Laird
James R. Larus
Charles E. Leiserson
Ming Li
Nick McKeown
J Strother Moore
Alan F. Newell
Peter Norvig
Dianne P. O'Leary
Dan R. Olsen Jr.
Kunle Olukotun
M. Tamer Özsu
Vern Paxson
Michael L. Scott
Harry Shum
Alfred Z. Spector
Victor D. Vianu
Marianne Winslett
Alexander L. Wolf
Bryant W. York
Stanley B. Zdonik
Lixia Zhang

2007

Anant Agarwal
Rajeev Alur
Utpal Banerjee
Catriel Beeri
Avrim Blum
Eric A. Brewer
Andrei Z. Broder
Michael F. Cohen
Larry L. Constantine
Danny Dolev
Rodney Graham Downey
Edward A. Feigenbaum
Edward W. Felten
Lance Fortnow
Guang R. Gao
Georg Gottlob
Richard Hull
Daniel P. Huttenlocher
Tao Jiang
John C. Klensin
Monica S. Lam
Marc Levoy
Bhubaneswar Mishra
J. Eliot B. Moss
Rajeev Motwani
Martin Odersky
Gary M. Olson
David Padua
Randy Pausch
Amir Pnueli

Aristides Requicha
Eric S. Roberts
Michael S. Scarborough
Demetri Terzopoulos
Donald E. Thomas
Philip Wadler
Mitchell Wand
Zhang Hongjiang

2008

Martín Abadi
Gregory D. Abowd
Alexander S. Aiken
Sanjeev Arora
Hari Balakrishnan
William A. S. Buxton
Kenneth L. Clarkson
Jason Cong
Perry Cook
Stephen A. Cook
Jack W. Davidson
Umeshwar Dayal
Xiaotie Deng
J. J. Garcia-Luna-Aceves
Michel X. Goemans
Patrick Hanrahan
Charles H. House
Watts S. Humphrey
Alan C. Kay
Joseph A. Konstan
Roy Levin
P. Geoffrey Lowney
Jitendra Malik
Kathryn S. McKinley
Bertrand Meyer
John C. Mitchell
Joel Moses
J. Ian Munro
Judith S. Olson
Lawrence C. Paulson
Hamid Pirahesh
Brian Randell
Michael K. Reiter
Jennifer Rexford
Jonathan S. Rose
Mendel Rosenblum
Rob A. Rutenbar
Tuomas W. Sandholm
Vivek Sarkar
Mark S. Squillante
Per Stenström
Madhu Sudan
Richard Szeliski
Douglas B. Terry

2009

Hagit Attiya
David F. Bacon
Ricardo A. Baeza-Yates
Chandrajit L. Bajaj
Vijay P. Bhatkar
José A. Blakeley
Gaetano Borriello
Alok Choudhary
Nell B. Dale
Bruce S. Davie
Jeffrey Dean
Thomas Dean
Bruce Randall Donald
Thomas D. Erickson
Gerhard Fischer
Ian Foster
Andrew V. Goldberg
Michael T. Goodrich
Venu Govindaraju
Rajiv Gupta
Joseph M. Hellerstein
Laurie J. Hendren
Urs Hölzle
Farnam Jahanian
Erich Kaltofen
David R. Karger
Arie E. Kaufman
Hans-Peter Kriegel
Maurizio Lenzerini
John C.S. Lui
Dinesh Manocha
Margaret Martonosi
Yossi Matias
Renée J. Miller
John T. Riedl
Martin C. Rinard
Patricia G. Selinger
R. K. Shyamasundar
Shang-Hua Teng
Chandramohan A. Thekkath
Robbert van Renesse
Baba C. Vemuri
Paulo Veríssimo
Martin Vetterli
Kyu-Young Whang
Yorick Alexander Wilks
Terry Winograd

2010

David Abramson
Sarita Adve
Lorenzo Alvisi
Luiz André Barroso
Doug Burger
Jennifer Chayes
Peter M. Chen
Anne Condon
Mark Crovella
Ron K. Cytron
Michael Dahlin
Amr El Abbadi
Carla S. Ellis
Christos Faloutsos
Kathleen Fisher
James Goodman
Wendy Hall
Jean-Pierre Hubaux
Michael I. Jordan
Lydia E. Kavraki
Sara Kiesler
Philip N. Klein
Donald Kossmann
John Launchbury
Richard F. Lyon
Raymond J. Mooney
S. Muthukrishnan
Fernando Pereira
Pavel Pevzner

David S. Rosenblum
Stefan Savage
Robert B. Schnabel
Daniel A. Spielman
Subhash Suri
Frank Wm. Tompa
Josep Torrellas
Stephen Trimberger
David M. Ungar
Andreas Zeller
Shumin Zhai

2011

Serge Abiteboul
Divyakant Agrawal
Ronald Baecker
Thomas J. Ball
Guy Blelloch
Carl Ebeling
David Eppstein
Geoffrey Charles Fox
George W. Furnas
David K. Gifford
Ramesh Govindan
Baining Guo
David Heckerman
Gerard J. Holzmann
Hugues Hoppe
Christian S. Jensen
Howard J. Karloff
Stephen W. Keckler
Peter B. Key
Scott Kirkpatrick
Robert E. Kraut
Susan Landau
Ming C. Lin
Peter S. Magnusson
Dahlia Malkhi
Keith Marzullo
Satoshi Matsuoka
Max Nelson
Joe Mitchell
Shubu Mukherjee
Beng Chin Ooi
Zehra Meral Ozsoyoglu
János Pach
Linda Petzold
Martha E. Pollack
Dan Roth
John W Sanguinetti
Margo Seltzer
Amit Singhal
Diane L. Souvaine
Divesh Srivastava
Dan Suciu
Dean M. Tullsen
Amin Vahdat
David Wetherall
Frank Kenneth Zadeck

2012

Gustavo Alonso
Lars Arge
Pierre Baldi
Hans-J. Boehm
Craig Boutilier
Tracy Camp
Rick Cattell
Larry Davis
Ahmed K. Elmagarmid
Wenfei Fan
Lixin Gao
Simson Garfinkel
Garth A. Gibson
Saul Greenberg
Markus Gross
David Grove
Jonathan Grudin
Rachid Guerraoui
Manish Gupta
John Hershberger
Andrew B. Kahng
Anna R. Karlin
Srinivasan Keshav
Gregor Kiczales
Masaru Kitsuregawa
Leonid Libkin
Tova Milo
Klara Nahrstedt
Joseph O'Rourke
Benjamin C. Pierce
Keshav K. Pingali
Andrew M. Pitts
Rajeev Rastogi
Raj Reddy
Keith W. Ross
Karem A. Sakallah
Robert Schreiber
Scott Stevens
Bart Selman
Ron Shamir
Yoav Shoham
Joseph Sifakis
Alistair Sinclair
Clifford Stein
Ion Stoica
Roberto Tamassia
Walter F. Tichy
Patrick Valduriez
Leslie G. Valiant
Kathy Yelick
Ramin Zabih
Xiaodong Zhang

2013

Mark S. Ackerman
Charu C. Aggarwal
James H. Anderson
Mihir Bellare
Christine L. Borgman
Stefano Ceri
Krishnendu Chakrabarty
Ramalingam Chellappa
Ingemar J. Cox
Carlos J. P. de Lucena
Rina Dechter
Chip Elliott
David Forsyth
Wen Gao
David Garlan
James Gosling
Peter J. Haas
Marti A. Hearst
Matthias Jarke
Sampath Kannan
David J. Kasik
Dina Katabi
Henry A. Kautz
Jon Kleinberg
Panganamala Ramana Kumar
Douglas S. Lea
Yoelle Maarek
Christopher D. Manning
Madhav Marathe
John Mellor-Crummey
Greg Morrisett
Andrew C. Myers
Dana S. Nau
Satish Rao
Stephen Robertson
Timothy Roscoe
Timoleon K. Sellis
Dennis Shasha
Nir N. Shavit
Kyuseok Shim
Padhraic Smyth
Milind Tambe
Val Tannen
David P. Williamson
Limsoon Wong
Moti Yung
Ellen W. Zegura
Zhengyou Zhang
Yuanyuan Zhou
David Zuckerman

2014

Samson Abramsky
Vikram Adve
Foto N. Afrati
Charles W. Bachman
Allan Borodin
Alan Bundy
Lorrie Faith Cranor
Timothy A. Davis
Srini Devadas
Inderjit S. Dhillon
Nikil D. Dutt
Faith Ellen
Michael D. Ernst
Adam Finkelstein
Juliana Freire
Johannes Gehrke
Eric Grimson
Mark Guzdial
Gernot Heiser
Eric Horvitz
Thorsten Joachims
Michael Kearns
Valerie King
Sarit Kraus
Leslie Lamport
Sharad Malik
Yishay Mansour
Subhasish Mitra
Michael Mitzenmacher
Robert Morris
Vijaykrishnan Narayanan
Shamkant B. Navathe
Jignesh M. Patel
Ranganathan Parthasarathy
Omer Reingold
Tom Rodden
Ronitt Rubinfeld
Daniela Rus
Alberto Luigi Sangiovanni-Vincentelli
Henning Schulzrinne
Stuart M. Shieber
Ramakrishnan Srikant
Aravind Srinivasan
S. Sudarshan
Paul Syverson
Gene Tsudik
Steve Whittaker

2015

Anastasia Ailamaki
Nancy M. Amato
David M. Blei
Naehyuck Chang
Hsinchun Chen
Mary Czerwinski
Giuseppe De Giacomo
Paul Dourish
Cynthia Dwork
Kevin Fall
Babak Falsafi
Michael Franz
Orna Grumberg
Ramanathan V. Guha
Jayant R. Haritsa
Julia Hirschberg
Piotr Indyk
Tei-Wei Kuo
Xavier Leroy
Chih-Jen Lin
Bing Liu
Yunhao Liu
Michael George Luby
Michael R. Lyu
Ueli Maurer
Patrick Drew McDaniel
Victor Miller
Elizabeth Mynatt
Judea Pearl
Jian Pei
Frank Pfenning
Dragomir R. Radev
Sriram Rajamani
Pablo Rodriguez
Mooly Sagiv
Peter Schröder
Assaf Schuster
Kevin Skadron
Wang-Chiew Tan
Santosh Vempala
Tandy Warnow
Michael Wooldridge

2016

Noga Alon
Paul Barford
Luca Benini
Ricardo Bianchini
Stephen Blackburn
Dan Boneh
Carla Brodley
Justine Cassell
Erik Demaine
Allison Druin
Frédo Durand
Nick Feamster
Jason Flinn
William Freeman
Yolanda Gil
Robert Lee Grossman
Rajesh K. Gupta
James Hendler
Monika Henzinger
Tony Hey
Xuedong Huang
Daniel Jackson
Robert J. K. Jacob
Somesh Jha
Ravindran Kannan
Anne-Marie Kermarrec
Martin L. Kersten
Christos Kozyrakis
Marta Kwiatkowska
James Landay
K. Rustan M. Leino
J. Brian Lyles
Todd C. Mowry
Trevor Mudge
Sharon Oviatt
Venkata Padmanabhan
Shwetak Patel
David Peleg
Radia Perlman
Adrian Perrig
Ganesan Ramalingam
Louiqa Raschid
Holly Rushmeier
Michael Saks
Sachin S. Sapatnekar
Abigail Sellen
Sudipta Sengupta
André Seznec
Valerie E. Taylor
Carlo Tomasi
Paul van Oorschot
Manuela M. Veloso
Zhou Zhi-Hua

2017

Lars Birkedal
Edouard Bugnion
Margaret Burnett
Shih-Fu Chang
Edith Cohen
Dorin Comaniciu
Susan M. Dray
Edward A. Fox
Richard M. Fujimoto
Shafi Goldwasser
Carla Gomes
Martin Grohe
Aarti Gupta
Venkatesan Guruswami
Dan Gusfield
Gregory D. Hager
Steven Michael Hand
Mor Harchol-Balter
Laxmikant Kale
Michael Kass
Angelos Dennis Keromytis
Carl Kesselman
Edward Knightly
Craig Knoblock
Insup Lee
Wenke Lee
Li Erran Li
Gabriel H. Loh
Tomás Lozano-Pérez
Clifford Lynch
Yi Ma
Andrew McCallum
Silvio Micali
Andreas Moshovos
Gail C. Murphy
Onur Mutlu
Nuria Oliver
Balaji Prabhakar
Tal Rabin
K. K. Ramakrishnan
Ravi Ramamoorthi
Yvonne Rogers
Yong Rui
Bernhard Schölkopf
Steven M. Seitz
Michael Sipser
Anand Sivasubramaniam
Mani B. Srivistava
Alexander Vardy
Geoffrey M. Voelker
Martin D. F. Wong
Qiang Yang
Cheng Xiang Zhai
Aidong Zhang

2018

Gul Agha
Krste Asanović
N. Asokan
Paul Barham
Peter L. Bartlett
David Basin
Elizabeth Belding
Rastislav Bodik
Katy Börner
Amy S. Bruckman
Jan Camenisch
Adnan Darwiche
André DeHon
Premkumar T. Devanbu
Tamal Dey
Sandhya Dwarkadas
Steven K. Feiner
Tim Finin
Thomas Funkhouser
Minos Garofalakis
Mario Gerla
Juan E. Gilbert
Mohammad Hajiaghayi
Dan Halperin
Johan Håstad
Tian He
Wendi Heinzelman
Aaron Hertzmann
Jessica Hodgins
John Hughes
Charles Lee Isbell Jr.
Kimberly Keeton
Sanjeev Khanna
Lillian Lee
F. Thomson Leighton
Fei-Fei Li
Michael L. Littman
Huan Liu
Jiebo Luo
Bruce Maggs
Bangalore S. Manjunath
Vishal Misra
Frank Mueller
David Parkes
Gurudatta Parulkar
Toniann Pitassi
Lili Qiu
Matthew Roughan
Amit Sahai
Alex Snoeren
Gerald Tesauro
Bhavani Thuraisingham
Salil Vadhan
Ellen Voorhees
Avi Wigderson
Alec Wolman

2019

Scott Aaronson
Tarek F. Abdelzaher
Saman Amarasinghe
Kavita Bala
Magdalena Bałazińska
Paul Beame
Emery D. Berger
Ronald F. Boisvert
Christian Cachin
Brad Calder
Diego Calvanese
Srdjan Capkun
Claire Cardie
Timothy M. Chan
K. Mani Chandy
Xilin Chen
Elizabeth F. Churchill
Philip R. Cohen
Vincent Conitzer
Noshir Contractor
Matthew B. Dwyer
Elena Ferrari
Michael J. Freedman
Deborah Frincke
Lise Getoor
Maria L. Gini
Subbarao Kambhampati
Tamara G. Kolda
Xiang-Yang Li
Songwu Lu
Wendy Mackay
Diana Marculescu
Sheila McIlraith
Rada Mihalcea
Robin Murphy
Marc Najork
Jason Nieh
Hanspeter Pfister
Timothy M. Pinkston
Mihai Pop
Andreas Reuter
Jeffrey S. Rosenschein
Srinivasan Seshan
Prashant J. Shenoy
Peter Shor
Mona Singh
Ramesh Sitaraman
Dawn Song
Salvatore J. Stolfo
Dacheng Tao
Moshe Tennenholtz
Giovanni Vigna
Nisheeth K. Vishnoi
Darrell Whitley
Yuan Xie
Moustafa Amin Youssef
Carlo A. Zaniolo
Lidong Zhou

2020 

Wil van der Aalst
Daniel Abadi
James Allan
Srinivas Aluru
Andrea Arpaci-Dusseau
Remzi Arpaci-Dusseau
Suman Banerjee
Manuel Blum
Lionel Briand
David Brooks
Ran Canetti
John Canny
Anantha P. Chandrakasan
Yao-Wen Chang
Moses Charikar
Yiran Chen
Graham Cormode
Patrick Cousot
Mathieu Desbrun
Whitfield Diffie
Bonnie Dorr
Nicholas Duffield
Alan Edelman
Thomas Eiter
Cormac Flanagan
Jodi Forlizzi
Dieter Fox
Sanjay Ghemawat
Antonio González
Andrew D. Gordon
Steven Gribble
Susanne Hambrusch
Martin Hellman
Nicholas Higham
Tony Hoare
Holger H. Hoos
Ihab Ilyas
Lizy John
Joost-Pieter Katoen
Nam Sung Kim
Sven Koenig
David Kotz
Arvind Krishnamurthy
Ravi Kumar
Brian Neil Levine
Kevin Leyton-Brown
Xuelong Li
Steven H. Low
Chenyang Lu
Samuel Madden
Scott Mahlke
David Maltz
Volker Markl
Maja Matarić
Filippo Menczer
Jose Meseguer
Meredith Ringel Morris
Nachiappan Nagappan
Radhika Nagpal
Moni Naor
Chandrasekhar Narayanaswami
Sam Noh
Prakash Panangaden
Sethuraman Panchanathan
Manish Parashar
Keshab Parhi
Haesun Park
Gordon Plotkin
Michael O. Rabin
Kui Ren
Paul Resnick
Mary Beth Rosson
Steven Salzberg
Sanjit Arunkumar Seshia
Adi Shamir
Heng Tao Shen
Amit Sheth
Adam D. Smith
Olga Sorkine-Hornung
Rick Stevens
Peter Stone
Yufei Tao
Leandros Tassiulas
Ken Thompson
Andrew Tomkins
Olga Troyanskaya
Matthew Turk
Toby Walsh
Wei Wang
Laurie Williams
Cathy H. Wu
Shuicheng Yan
Wang Yi
Michael Zyda
Kun Zhou

2021 

Leonard Adleman
David Bader
Meenakshi Balakrishnan
Nikolaj Bjørner
Mark Braverman
L. Jean Camp
Edward Y. Chang
Tanzeem Choudhury
Daniel Cohen-Or
Gautam Das
Anind Dey
Lieven Eeckhout
Martin Farach-Colton
Amos Fiat
Hubertus Franke
Batya Friedman
Evgeniy Gabrilovich
Judith Gal-Ezer
Deepak Ganesan
Anupam Gupta
Zygmunt Haas
Elad Hazan
Xiaobo Sharon Hu
Paola Inverardi
Zachary Ives
Sushil Jajodia
Ranjit Jhala
David R. Kaeli
Jonathan Katz
Robert Kleinberg
Thomas Lengauer
Fei-Fei Li
Hai Li
Ninghui Li
Tie-Yan Liu
Steve Marschner
Matthew T. Mason
Dale A. Miller
Elchanan Mossel
Bernhard Nebel
Rafail Ostrovsky
Joel Ouaknine
David Z. Pan
Rosalind Picard
Shaz Qadeer
Glenn Ricart
Tajana Rosing
Robert B. Ross
Szymon Rusinkiewicz
Pierangela Samarati
Sunita Sarawagi
Bernt Schiele
Mubarak Ali Shah
Alla Sheffer
Munindar P. Singh
Aravinda P. Sistla
Scott A. Smolka
Jie Tang
Mark Tehranipoor
Luca Trevisan
Wenping Wang
Brent Waters
Ryen W. White
Jacob O. Wobbrock
Tao Xie
Ming-Hsuan Yang
Mohammed Zaki
Ben Y. Zhao
Lin Zhong
Shlomo Zilberstein
Thomas Zimmermann

2022 

Maneesh Agrawala
Anima Anandkumar
David Atienza
Boaz Barak
Michel Beaudouin-Lafon
Peter Boncz

Ed Chi
Corinna Cortes
Bill Curtis
Constantinos Daskalakis
Kalyanmoy Deb

Sebastian Elbaum

Craig Gotsman
Ahmed E. Hassan

Jörg Henkel

Hiroshi Ishii
Alfons Kemper
Samir Khuller
Farinaz Koushanfar
C.-C. Jay Kuo

Radu Marculescu
Mei Hong
David Mount
Gonzalo Navarro

Marc Pollefeys

Ashutosh Sabharwal

Stefano Soatto
John Stasko

Gary Sullivan
Jaime Teevan
Kentaro Toyama
René Vidal
Eric Xing
Dong Yu

Haitao Zheng

References

 
Association for Computing Machinery